The Sweetness of Loving (French: La douceur d'aimer) is a 1930 French comedy film directed by René Hervil and starring Victor Boucher, Renée Devillers and Henri Bosc.

Cast
 Victor Boucher as Albert Dumontier 
 Renée Devillers as Germaine 
 Henri Bosc as Robert-Henri 
 Alice Roberts as Ruzy Valbreuse 
 Thérèse Dorny as Lorette 
 Simone Bourday as Simone 
 Arletty as Une dactylo 
 Alexandre Mihalesco
 René Bergeron
 Willy Leardy
 Ray De Verly
 Jean Diéner
 Hubert Daix

References

Bibliography 
 Rège, Philippe. Encyclopedia of French Film Directors, Volume 1. Scarecrow Press, 2009.

External links 
 

1930 films
French comedy films
1930 comedy films
1930s French-language films
Films directed by René Hervil
French black-and-white films
Films scored by Casimir Oberfeld
1930s French films